Veer Surendra Sai Institute of Medical Sciences and Research (VSSIMSAR), formerly Burla Medical College (BMC) and Veer Surendra Sai Medical College and Hospital (VSSMCH), popularly known as VIMSAR, is a government-run Medical Institute and hospital in the Indian state of Odisha. Established in 1959, it imparts medical education at both the undergraduate and postgraduate levels.

Location
The Campus of Veer Surendra Sai Medical College & Hospital is situated in Sambalpur, Odisha, about 330 kilometres North West of the state capital Bhubaneswar.

History
In 1958, to provide a solution to healthcare problems in western Odisha, the then Chief Minister of Odisha, Harekrushna Mahatab, took the decision to set up a medical college at Burla, the second in the state and the 54th in the country. Consequently, the Burla Medical College (BMC) came into existence in July, 1959, with 41 male and 9 female students selected from SCB Medical College in Cuttack to become its first batch of students.
		
The College started to function in the present Old College Building (OCB), under the guidance of Radhanath Mishra as its first principal. Initially, the Medical Council of India (MCI) refused to recognize BMC, citing gross infrastructural inadequacy. So, a new sprawling campus was designed, complete with the main college building, the hospital building, hostels and staff quarters. Construction began on 12 February 1961. On completion of the work in 1966, the college was moved to the new campus and it finally received MCI approval in 1967. In 1969, it was rechristened Veer Surendra Sai Medical College in honor of Veer Surendra Sai.

Academics

VSS Medical College offers both undergraduate and postgraduate courses in the field of medical science as well as other paramedical courses.

The college offers the four and a half year MBBS course with a one-year compulsory rotating internship in affiliated hospitals to a maximum of 200 students per year. Admission to this course is on the basis of merit. Out of the 200, 30 seats are filled through the AIQ (All India Quota) of NEET exam conducted by the NTA and the remaining 170 seats are filled through the same exam by OJEE. The acceptance rate to this course is 0.2% (1 in every 500 aspirants).

The college offers 74 places in postgraduate courses. The admission is through Odisha Post Graduate medical Examination and at the national level through All India Post Graduate Medical Entrance Examination (AIPGMEE). 50% of the places are reserved for in-service candidates. The courses award the degrees of MD or MS, in various fields.

The college also offers diploma studies in various paramedical fields.

Students' life

Students are represented by an undergraduate students’ union, elected annually by a campus-wide election from the students of the fourth year in March–April. The office holders of the students’ union organise various programmes, activities and inter-class competitions throughout the year which culminates with the annual function of the union in December. Postgraduate students are represented by a similar union, known as the Junior Doctors’ Association.
		
The inter-medical college festival, "Euphoria", is organized every three years. A large number of students gather for a four-day extravaganza and participate in various cultural, dramatic, literary and sports competitions.
		
"PRAYAS" is a non-profit organization formed by the students which strives to provide proper medical treatment to financially challenged persons by providing free medicines and also to create a large pool of donors to counter the perennial shortage of blood units in the hospital's blood bank.

Notable alumni
 B. K. Misra – Neurosurgeon, recipient of Dr. B. C. Roy Award, the highest medical honour in India.
 Sambit Patra – Indian Politician

See also
 List of medical colleges in India
 Education in India

References

External links

Medical colleges in Odisha
Universities and colleges in Sambalpur
Educational institutions established in 1959
1959 establishments in Orissa